Berlin School of Creative Leadership is an international business school headquartered in Charlottenburg, Berlin. The school was founded in 2006 with the purpose of ‘furthering the development of leadership executives in the creative industries’. The school offers two primary streams of learning — 

 Global Executive MBA in Creative Leadership Program and 
 Catalogue of non-degree Executive Education programs.

As part of Steinbeis-Hochschule (Steinbeis University, Berlin), the school offers an accredited Executive Master of Business Administration degree to its Executive MBA graduates. The school's curriculum is aimed at mid-career creative professionals from around the world, working in fields such as advertising, media, marketing, and design. The Berlin School Executive MBA stream operates as a registered non-profit organization.

History 

The Berlin School of Creative Leadership was founded in 2006 by executives and academics from the creative industries. The Art Directors Club Germany (ADC) and the Steinbeis School of Management and Innovation collaborated to establish the school. SMI is a branch of Germany's oldest and largest private business school, Steinbeis-Hochschule (Steinbeis University, Berlin), which functions as a global academic network of 1.000 affiliated institutes in the fields of consultancy, research, development, and education. The Berlin School's Executive MBA in Creative Leadership is internationally recognized and accredited by the Foundation for International Business Administration Accreditation (FIBAA).

Since its founding, the Berlin School of Creative Leadership has offered a part-time global Executive MBA and Executive Education programs designed for professionals in the creative industries. Programs are taught in the English language, with participants and alumni coming from over 60 countries. Initially, the school's focus was on the advertising industry. This has since diversified to include all areas of the creative industries, including design, architecture, media and music, as well as executives working outside of this realm, for example in finance, transport and hospitality. In 2010, the Berlin School launched the first annual Cannes Creative Leadership Programme (CCLP) — a two-week non-degree leadership workshop, held in conjunction with Cannes Lions. In 2014, the school expanded its non-degree catalogue by launching the Executive Education learning stream, featuring workshops, custom programs, and partner programs catering to individuals, organizations and events.

References

Business schools in Germany
Steinbeis-Hochschule Berlin
Universities and colleges in Berlin